Charlotte Township is located in Livingston County, Illinois. As of the 2010 census, its population was 136 and it contained 67 housing units. Charlotte Township formed from Saunemin Township sometime in 1865.

Geography

Demographics

References

External links
US Census
City-data.com
Illinois State Archives

Townships in Livingston County, Illinois
Populated places established in 1865
Townships in Illinois
1865 establishments in Illinois